Angelica is a genus of about 90 species of tall biennial and perennial herbs in the family Apiaceae, native to temperate and subarctic regions of the Northern Hemisphere, reaching as far north as Iceland, Lapland, and Greenland. Found mainly in China, its main use was for medicine. It shows variations in fruit anatomy, leaf morphology, and subterranean structures. The genes are extremely polymorphic.

Some species can be found in purple moor and rush pastures.

Characteristics
Their large, sparkling, starburst flowers are pollinated by a great variety of insects (the generalist pollination syndrome), the floral scents are species-specific, and even specific to particular subspecies. The active ingredients of angelica are found in the roots and rhizomes and contains furocoumarins in its tissues, which make the skin sensitive to light.

Species
List of species accepted by Plants of the World Online :
Angelica adzharica – Adjarian angelica
Angelica ampla – giant angelica
Angelica angelicastrum – Norwegian angelica
Angelica anomala – anomalous angelica
Angelica apaensis
Angelica archangelica – garden angelica, archangel, angelique
Angelica arguta – sharp-toothed angelica, Lyall's angelica
Angelica atropurpurea – purplestem angelica, alexanders, American angelica, masterwort
Angelica biserrata – heavy-toothed angelica
Angelica brevicaulis – short-stem angelica
Angelica breweri – Brewer's angelica
Angelica californica – California angelica
Angelica callii – Call's angelica
Angelica canbyi – Canby's angelica
Angelica capitellata – Ranger buttons
Angelica cartilaginomarginata –  in Korean
Angelica cincta – Hubei angelica
Angelica cryptotaeniifolia –  in Japanese
Angelica cyclocarpa – Nepalese angelica
Angelica czernaevia – Eastern Siberian angelica, parsley angelica
Angelica dabashanensis
Angelica dahurica –  in Chinese
Angelica dailingensis
Angelica dawsonii – Dawson's angelica
Angelica decurrens – descending angelica
Angelica decursiva –  in Japanese
Angelica dentata – coastalplain angelica
Angelica duclouxii – DuCloux's angelica
Angelica edulis –  in Japanese
Angelica genuflexa – kneeling angelica
Angelica gigas –  in Korean
Angelica glauca –  (Kumaoni language), chippe/chouru' in Uttarakhandi languages (India)
Angelica gmelinii – Gmelin's angelica, Okhostk angelica
Angelica grayi – Gray's angelica
Angelica hakonensis – Hakone angelica
Angelica hendersonii – Henderson's angelica
Angelica heterocarpa – variable-fruit angelica
Angelica inaequalis – unequal angelica
Angelica indica – Indian angelica
Angelica japonica – Japanese angelica,  in Japanese
Angelica kaghanica
Angelica kangdingensis
Angelica keiskei –  in Japanese
Angelica kingii – King's angelica
Angelica komarovii
Angelica laxifoliata
Angelica lignescens 
Angelica likiangensis
Angelica lineariloba – poison angelica
Angelica longeradiata
Angelica longicaudata
Angelica longipes
Angelica lucida – seacoast angelica
Angelica major
Angelica maowenensis
Angelica megaphylla
Angelica minamitanii
Angelica mixta
Angelica morii
Angelica morrisonicola
Angelica muliensis
Angelica multicaulis
Angelica multisecta
Angelica nakaiana
Angelica nelsonii
Angelica nitida
Angelica nubigena
Angelica oreada
Angelica pachycarpa – Portuguese angelica
Angelica paeoniifolia
Angelica palustris – marsh angelica
Angelica pinnata – small-leaf angelica
Angelica pinnatiloba
Angelica polymorpha
Angelica pseudoselinum
Angelica pseudoshikokiana
Angelica pubescens –  in Japanese,  in Chinese
Angelica pyrenaea
Angelica razulii
Angelica roseana – rose angelica
Angelica saxatilis
Angelica saxicola
Angelica scabrida – Charleston Mountain angelica, rough angelica
Angelica setchuenensis
Angelica shikokiana
Angelica sinanomontana
Angelica sylvestris – wild angelica
Angelica taiwaniana
Angelica tarokoensis
Angelica tenuisecta
Angelica tenuissima – Korean gobon, slender angelica
Angelica ternata
Angelica tianmuensis
Angelica tomentosa – woolly angelica
Angelica triquinata – filmy angelica, mountain angelica
Angelica turcica
Angelica ubadakensis
Angelica ursina – ezo angelica
Angelica urumiensis
Angelica valida
Angelica venenosa – hairy angelica
Angelica viridiflora
Angelica wheeleri – Utah angelica
Angelica yakusimensis
Angelica yanyuanensis

Cultivation and uses
Some species are grown as flavouring agents or for their medicinal properties. The most notable of these is garden angelica (A. archangelica), which is commonly known simply as angelica. Natives of Lapland use the fleshy roots as food and the stalks as medicine. Crystallized strips of young angelica stems and midribs are green in colour and are sold as decorative and flavoursome cake decoration material, but may also be enjoyed on their own. The roots and seeds are commonly used to flavour gin.  Its presence accounts for the distinct flavour of many liqueurs, such as Chartreuse.

Among the Sami people of Lapland, the plant is used to make a traditional musical instrument the fadno.

Seacoast angelica (A. lucida) has been eaten as a wild version of celery.

In parts of Japan, especially the Izu Islands, the shoots and leaves of ashitaba (A. keiskei) are eaten as tempura, particularly in the spring.

A. sylvestris and some other species are eaten by the larvae of some Lepidoptera species, including bordered pug, grey pug, lime-speck pug and the V-pug.

A. dawsonii was used by several first nations in North America for ritual purposes.

A. atropurpurea is found in North America from Newfoundland west to Wisconsin and south to Maryland, and was smoked by Missouri tribes for colds and respiratory ailments.  This species is very similar in appearance to the poisonous water hemlock.

The boiled roots of angelica were applied internally and externally to wounds by the Aleut people in Alaska to speed healing.

The herb, also known by the Chinese name, and Latin name, is used medicinally in traditional Chinese medicine.

Notes

References

External links

 
 
 Traditional and Modern Use of Wild Angelica

 
Apioideae genera
Medicinal plants